Gregor Clemens (born 26 June 1982 in Leipzig, Germany) is a fashion designer and designer of jewellery.

Clemens grew up as the son of information technology specialist Eberhard Clemens and his wife Sylvia Clemens.

After finishing grammar school in 2002, he lived for one year in London to improve his English and study fashion. After he had tried to launch a fashion line by himself and after some experience in the business he was hired by the German fashion label Lac et Mel. The first fashion show took place at a variety theatre in Leipzig on 21 October.

Clemens' collections have been shown at the Mercedes-Benz Fashion Week in Berlin. In March 2010 Clemens started  his own brand under his name with a new collection.  Gregor is now based in London and lives in West Dulwich with his fiancé Jon and their Jack Russell, Eddie.

Sources 
Lacetmel
Review in Vogue UK
Report in New York Times
Interview Europe Fashion

1982 births
Living people
Businesspeople from Leipzig
German fashion designers
German jewellery designers
German expatriates in England